Pseudochromis andamanensis, the Andaman dottyback,  is a species of ray-finned fish from Australia which is a member of the family Pseudochromidae.

References

andamanensis
Taxa named by Roger Lubbock
Fish described in 1980
Fish of Australia